Feral Roots is the sixth studio album by American rock band Rival Sons. It was released on January 25, 2019, through Low Country Sound and Atlantic Records. It is the band's first album since Hollow Bones (2016), and their first release on Atlantic Records. It was preceded by the lead single "Do Your Worst", which peaked at number one on the Billboard Mainstream Rock Songs chart in March 2019.

Critical reception

Michael Pementel of Consequence of Sound gave the album a grade of B+ and said the album shows off Rival Sons' "range in performing bluesy rock 'n' roll; with high energy riffs and slow melancholy rhythms, the music offers a variety of emotional tones for listeners to absorb", and concluding that for listeners new to Rival Sons, "Feral Roots is an excellent place to start".

James Christopher Monger of AllMusic has called the track "Do Your Worst" "a radio-ready banger that evokes both Led Zeppelin and the Black Keys." He also points similarities between the track "Look Away" and the album Led Zeppelin III. Loudwire named it one of the 50 best rock albums of 2019.

At the 2020 Grammy Awards, the album was nominated for Best Rock Album, losing to Cage the Elephant's Social Cues. "Too Bad" was nominated for Best Rock Performance, losing to Gary Clark Jr.'s "This Land".

Track listing

Personnel

Rival Sons
 Jay Buchanan – vocals, rhythm guitar on tracks 5 and 9
 Scott Holiday – guitars
 Michael Miley – drums
 Dave Beste – bass guitars

Additional musicians
 Todd Ögren – keyboards on tracks 1-5, 7–11
 Kristen Rogers and Whitney Coleman – backing vocals on tracks 1-3, 5, 7, 8 and 9
 The Nashville Urban Choir – additional vocals on track 11

Production
 Dave Cobb – producer, mixing, rhythm guitar on tracks 7 and 11
 Eddie Spear – recording engineer
 Gena Johnson and Chris Taylor – recording engineers
 Andrew Scheps – mixing
 Pete Lyman – mastering

Additional
 Martin Wittfooth – album cover ("Wildmother" painting)
 Mark Obriski – art direction and design
 Steven J. Bradley – photography

Credits adapted from liner notes.

Charts

Weekly charts

Year-end charts

References

2019 albums
Rival Sons albums
Atlantic Records albums
Albums recorded at Muscle Shoals Sound Studio